Hellraiser is a 2022 supernatural horror film directed by David Bruckner, with a screenplay by Ben Collins and Luke Piotrowski, from a screen story they co-wrote with David S. Goyer. It is a reboot of the Hellraiser franchise, the eleventh installment overall, and a second adaptation of the 1986 novella The Hellbound Heart by Clive Barker, which was adapted into the 1987 film Hellraiser.  The film stars Odessa A'zion, Jamie Clayton, Adam Faison, Drew Starkey, Brandon Flynn, Aoife Hinds, Jason Liles, Yinka Olorunnife, Selina Lo, Zachary Hing, Kit Clarke, Goran Višnjić, and Hiam Abbass. It follows a young woman recovering from addiction who ends up with a mechanical puzzle box that can summon the Cenobites, humanoid beings who thrive on pain and pleasure.

Plans for a Hellraiser remake were publicized in October 2007, when Alexandre Bustillo and Julien Maury were reported to be directing, with Barker producing and Marcus Dunstan and Patrick Melton writing the script. After Maury and Bustillo left the project, Todd Farmer and Patrick Lussier were attached, with production slated for an early 2012 release. However, following the release of Hellraiser: Revelations (2011) to secure continuing rights, Farmer and Lussier were no longer involved. By 2018, after the critical and commercial success of Halloween, Miramax Films had confirmed plans for new Hellraiser installments, including a prequel and a new chapter of the series. The film was green-lit in early 2019, with Bruckner directing from a script written by Collins and Piotrowski, while the project moved to Hulu with Spyglass Media Group and Phantom Four Films. Filming took place from September to October 2021.

Hellraiser had its world premiere at Fantastic Fest on September 28, 2022, and was later released on October 7 by Hulu. The film received lukewarm reviews from critics, with some deeming it an improvement over its predecessors and the best since the original 1987 film; it was praised for its new take on the series, faithfulness to the tone of the source material and Clayton's performance, while being criticized for its rushed characters and runtime.

Plot 
During a party at hedonistic millionaire Roland Voight's mansion, sex worker Joey comes across a mechanical puzzle box, which Voight insists he solve. Joey solves the configuration and is stabbed by a blade that springs from the box. A portal opens, from which chains fly out and rip Joey apart.

Six years later, recovering addict Riley is living with her brother Matt, his boyfriend Colin, and their roommate Nora. Riley's boyfriend, Trevor, convinces her to help break into an abandoned storage warehouse, where they discover and take the puzzle box. Returning home late, Riley gets into an argument with Matt and leaves. At an empty park, she solves the box and avoids being cut by the blade. The Cenobites, a group of mutilated humanoids, appear and demand she choose another sacrifice. Matt finds Riley blacked out and, as he tries to wake her up, inadvertently cuts himself on the box. He goes to a nearby restroom to clean his wound. Riley hears him scream and discovers that he has vanished.

Believing the box caused Matt's disappearance, Riley and Trevor track down Serena Menaker, Voight's former lawyer, who had hidden it in the warehouse. Menaker tries to take the box from Riley but is inadvertently cut by the blade and later taken by the Cenobites. Riley visits Voight's abandoned mansion, finding his journals and learning that the box has multiple configurations, each of which requires a victim to be "marked" by the box's blade for the Cenobites to take. On completion, the box allows its holder to receive a "gift" from Leviathan, the entity that rules over Hell. Riley sees an apparition of Matt and is horrified to discover he has been flayed.

Trevor, Colin, and Nora arrive to take Riley home. While Riley explains her findings to Colin, the still-living but mutilated Voight, who is hiding inside the walls, stabs Nora with the box. The group escapes the mansion in a van, but Nora is taken by the Cenobites. Their leader, the Priest, taunts and flays Nora. The group crashes the van and walks back toward the mansion. Riley is confronted by the Priest, who offers to resurrect Matt if Riley chooses two more sacrifices. Riley refuses, and is cut by the blade. Now marked, the Priest commands Riley to choose two more sacrifices or become a victim herself. After Trevor is injured by one of the Cenobites, the Chatterer, Riley solves the next configuration and stabs it. The Cenobite gets torn to pieces as the next sacrifice.

The group makes it back to the mansion, realizing that there are steel doors designed to lock the Cenobites out. Riley and Colin leave Trevor to rest, and it is revealed that Trevor has been working for Voight to find people to sacrifice to the puzzle box. Riley and Colin trap a Cenobite, the Asphyx, to become the last sacrifice, but Voight appears and stabs Colin with the box. Voight reveals that he sought new pleasurable sensations after completing all of his sacrifices, but his "reward" was a contraption attached to him that twists his nerve endings, leaving him in constant pain. He completes the final configuration and traps the Cenobites, demanding they ask Leviathan to free him from his "gift". While Leviathan appears in the sky above the mansion, Riley retrieves the box and unlocks the steel doors, letting in the Cenobites. Riley saves Colin from torture by stabbing Trevor, choosing him as a new final sacrifice. Trevor is mutilated and dragged to Hell. Meanwhile, the Priest tells Voight that his reward cannot be revoked, but can be traded for a different reward. She offers him "power", which he accepts. Voight is released from his contraption and healed, only to be immediately impaled with a large chain by Leviathan and lifted away.

With the sacrifices completed, the Cenobites tell Riley they can resurrect Matt as a gift. Riley refuses to have any gift because she knows it is always going to be twisted, and tells them that she will accept Matt's death. The Cenobites tell her that by choosing to live with her guilt and loss, she has effectively chosen the gift of "lament". The box reverts to its cube configuration and the Cenobites disappear. As Riley and Colin leave the mansion, he asks her if she made the right choice; Riley remains silent. Inside Leviathan, Voight undergoes a brutal transformation into a new Cenobite.

Cast

Production

Development
In October 2006, Clive Barker announced through his official website that he would be writing the script to a forthcoming remake of the original Hellraiser film, to be produced by Dimension Films. In October 2007, Julien Maury and Alexandre Bustillo were eyed to direct. By January 2008, the project, then titled Clive Barker Presents: Hellraiser, was delayed to an unspecified date in 2009 following the studio's dissatisfaction with Maury and Bustillo's script. In February 2008, Marcus Dunstan and Patrick Melton were tapped for a page-one rewrite, and production was gearing up to begin that spring. By June 2008, the directing pair had dropped the project to work on Halloween II. That October, French director Pascal Laugier was set to direct. Laugier told Dread Central in March 2009 that work on the film had begun with a co-writer he could not publicly name. However, Laugier wanted a very serious take whereas the producers wanted a more commercial film that would appeal to a teen audience, and he left the project in June 2009.

Throughout 2010, further pitches were given by Christian E. Christiansen, Cory Goodman, and from writing duo Josh Stolberg and Peter Goldfinger. In October 2010, Christiansen was reported to be in the running for director while Amber Heard was considered for the lead role. Mere days later, it was officially announced that Patrick Lussier and Todd Farmer were to direct and write, respectively, a reboot of the Hellraiser franchise. The story would have differed from the original film, as Lussier and Farmer did not want to retell the original story out of respect for Barker's work, instead focusing on the world and function of the puzzle box. However, in 2011, Farmer confirmed that both he and Lussier were dropped from the project.

In October 2013, Barker announced that he would be directing and writing the film, and Doug Bradley was to return in his role as Pinhead. A year later, Barker stated that a second draft of the script was completed and described the film as a "very loose" remake of the original film, but said that he may not direct the film. In March 2017, Barker said that the film's "script was written and delivered to Dimension years ago. That was the last anyone heard until news of a sequel surfaced". After the successful release of the 2018 horror sequel Halloween, Miramax Films confirmed that it was considering beginning production on new installments to the Hellraiser franchise. Lussier and Farmer had worked out numerous ideas whilst working on the project; one being a prequel starring William Fichtner as Pinhead, while another pitch had Pinhead portrayed by a woman.

In May 2019, Gary Barber announced that Spyglass Media Group would be developing a new remake of Hellraiser to be written and co-produced by David S. Goyer. In April 2020, David Bruckner was reported to direct the remake, with Ben Collins and Luke Piotrowski writing the script after having previously collaborated with Bruckner on The Night House (2020), which Goyer also produced. In December 2020, following a legal dispute, Barker officially regained the rights to the property in the United States.

Pre-production
In June 2021, it was reported that Odessa A'zion was cast in the lead role. In a July 2021 interview with Entertainment Weekly, it was revealed that the film's producers auditioned drag performer Gottmik for the role of Pinhead, after Gottmik showed off a Pinhead-inspired look for a runway, on RuPaul's Drag Race.

Filming 
In September 2021, Goyer announced that the production crew was "in the midst of" filming, confirming that principal photography had commenced in Belgrade, Serbia. In October 2021, after filming wrapped, Jamie Clayton was revealed to have portrayed Pinhead, while Brandon Flynn, Goran Višnjić, Drew Starkey, Adam Faison, Aoife Hinds, Selina Lo and Hiam Abbass were unveiled as supporting cast. Bruckner and the crew reached out to Bradley to make a cameo appearance in the film, but Bradley declined for two reasons: first, potential complications with the ongoing COVID-19 pandemic and secondly, his desire to leave his Pinhead performance's legacy intact, a decision Bruckner and his crew accepted.

Release
Hellraiser had its world premiere at Fantastic Fest in Austin, Texas, on September 28, 2022. It screened at Beyond Fest in Santa Monica, California, on October 4, 2022. The film was released in the United States by Hulu via streaming exclusively on their service on October 7, 2022, as a Hulu Original.
On October 5, 2022, director David Bruckner announced on Twitter that Spyglass and Paramount Pictures are handling international distribution for the film. The film was released in the United Kingdom via various platforms (by purchase) on 31 October 2022.

Reception

Audience viewership 
According to Whip Media, Hellraiser was the 3rd most streamed film in the United States, during the week of October 9. According to the streaming aggregator Reelgood, Hellraiser was the 8th most watched program across all platforms, during the week of October 14. Hellraiser was the 9th most watched program across all platforms, during the week of October 19. According to the streaming aggregator JustWatch, Hellraiser was the most watched movie across all platforms in the United States, during the week of October 3 and the week of October 10.

Critical reception 
 

Katie Rife of Polygon criticized the characters and the length, but praised the set design and Clayton's performance, and felt overall the film "might even be the second best in the series after Hellbound: Hellraiser II". Dave White of TheWrap wrote, "Embodying Clive Barker's original intention of 'repulsive glamour', these Cenobites silently glide on hell's runway. The assignment was 'red flesh and raw meat, but make it fashion', and their work is an elegant slam dunk." Mark Hanson of Slant Magazine called it "a toothlessly retrograde enterprise".

References

External links 
 Hellraiser on Hulu
 

Hellraiser films
2022 horror films
2020s American films
2020s English-language films
2020s supernatural horror films
2020s monster movies
American supernatural horror films
Serbian horror films
Demons in film
Films based on British horror novels
Films based on works by Clive Barker
Films directed by David Bruckner
Films produced by David S. Goyer
Films shot in Belgrade
Films set in country houses
Films with screenplays by Ben Collins (writer)
Films with screenplays by Luke Piotrowski
Hulu original films
Reboot films
Spyglass Entertainment films